Peter Luke Smith (born March 19, 1940) is a former pitcher in Major League Baseball who played from  to  for the Boston Red Sox. Listed at 6' 2", 190 lb., Smith batted and threw right-handed.

A native of Natick, Massachusetts, he idolized Bobby Doerr as a child and graduated from Natick High School in 1957 before attending Colgate University.

At Colgate, Smith played baseball and soccer and ran cross country. He set a NCAA record by striking out 23 batters in a game against Bucknell.

In a two-season career, Smith posted a 0–1 record with a 6.75 ERA in seven appearances, including two starts, giving up 14 runs on 18 hits and eight walks while striking out seven in  innings of work.

On September 28, 1963, at Fenway Park, Smith started a triple play against the Angels with the last ball he fielded in the majors. With Charlie Dees running on second base and Lee Thomas on first, Félix Torres tried to advance both runners with a bunt. Unfortunately for Torres, Smith fielded cleanly the ball and threw to 3B Frank Malzone, who tagged Dees out before throwing the ball to SS Eddie Bressoud, covering second to double out Thomas. Bressoud then threw to 2B Félix Mantilla, who covered first and completed the 1-5-6-4 triple play.

After the end of his baseball career, he served as a school guidance counselor mostly in Westchester County, New York.

References

External links

The Baseball Cube
September 28, 1963 Box Score

1940 births
Living people
Alpine Cowboys players
Baseball players from Massachusetts
Boston Red Sox players
Colgate Raiders baseball players
Johnstown Red Sox players
Major League Baseball pitchers
People from Natick, Massachusetts
Pittsfield Red Sox players
Seattle Rainiers players
Sportspeople from Middlesex County, Massachusetts
Natick High School alumni
Colgate Raiders men's soccer players